Percy Douglas Tomlinson (1882-1961) was an English bowls player who competed in the British Empire Games.

Bowls career
At the 1934 British Empire Games he won the gold medal in the rinks (fours) event with Robert Slater, Ernie Gudgeon and Fred Biggin.

References

English male bowls players
Bowls players at the 1934 British Empire Games
Commonwealth Games gold medallists for England
Commonwealth Games medallists in lawn bowls
1882 births
1961 deaths
Medallists at the 1934 British Empire Games